Bill Bowerman is an outdoor 2000 sculpture of the American track and field coach of the same name by Diana Lee Jackson, installed outside the Bowerman Family Building, in the corner of Hayward Field, on the University of Oregon campus in Eugene, Oregon, in the United States.

Bowerman co-founded the American multinational corporation Nike, Inc.; Jackson was a Nike employee. The statue was installed on June 21, 2000.

See also
 2000 in art

Further reading

References

2000 establishments in Oregon
2000 sculptures
Monuments and memorials in Eugene, Oregon
Outdoor sculptures in Eugene, Oregon
Sculptures of men in Oregon
Statues in Eugene, Oregon
University of Oregon campus